Joseph Henry Baker (17 July 1940 – 6 October 2003) was an England international footballer. Born in Woolton in Liverpool, England, he spent virtually his entire childhood growing up in Motherwell, Scotland. He is notable for being the first professional player to have played for England without having previously played in the English football league system, and for scoring over 100 goals in both the English and Scottish leagues. His brother Gerry Baker was also a professional footballer, who played internationally for the United States.

Early years
Joe Baker's mother was Scottish. His father, George, born in Woolton, was a sailor. When living in New York, Joe's elder brother, Gerry, was born in 1938. After the outbreak of World War 2, the family moved to Liverpool when George volunteered for the Merchant Marines. George survived his boat being torpedoed but soon after died from the injuries he received. The family then evacuated to Motherwell in Scotland, just six weeks after Joe’s birth and this is where the Baker brothers spent the rest of their childhood.

Club career

Hibernian
A centre forward, Baker spent a month on trial with Chelsea as a youngster, but was not signed. He signed professional terms with Hibernian after playing Junior football for local Coltness United, and was then farmed out to another Junior team, Armadale Thistle. In his first season with Hibs, the 17-year-old Baker scored all four goals in Hibs' 4–3 victory over city rivals Hearts in the quarter-final of the 1958 Scottish Cup. He played in the 1958 Scottish Cup Final which Hibs lost 1–0 to Clyde, and also scored nine goals in a Scottish Cup tie against Peebles Rovers. Baker was Hibs' top goalscorer for four consecutive seasons, scoring a club record 42 goals in 33 league games during the 1959–60 season. In all he scored 102 goals in just 117 league games, and 159 goals in all competitions for the Edinburgh club.

Gerry Baker signed for Hibernian from Manchester City in November 1961, not long after Joe had left Easter Road.

Torino
In 1961, Baker was transferred to Torino for £75,000, after the Hibs board refused to give him a £5 increase from his existing wage of £12 a week. Despite scoring a winning goal in a Turin derby match against Juventus, his time at the Italian club was short and almost ended in tragedy. Baker was involved in a serious car crash, which meant that he needed life-saving surgery and spent over a month on a drip feed. It was a generally unhappy spell as Baker did not like the press intrusion, which meant that he and teammate Denis Law spent most of their time in their Turin apartment.

Arsenal
Baker recovered from his injuries and he returned to the UK in July 1962, joining Billy Wright's Arsenal for a club record fee of £70,000. He made his debut against Leyton Orient on 18 August 1962, and in all spent four seasons with the Gunners. For three out of those four seasons (1962–63, 1964–65 and 1965–66) he was the club's top scorer; in total he scored 100 goals in 156 games in all competitions, making him one of the club's most prolific goalscorers of all time.

His pace and acceleration made him a highly effective and dynamic attacker, and he was equally adept with his feet and his head, despite his lack of height. With Geoff Strong he formed one of Arsenal's most prolific striking partnerships, but the defence could not match the quality of the team's attack, which meant they were unable to finish above 7th in the league during his time at the club.

Nottingham Forest
After a disappointing 1965–66 season, Wright sold Baker to Nottingham Forest for £65,000. Baker had a successful 1966/67 at Forest, as the club finished runners-up in the top division to the club that would win the following season's European Cup: Matt Busby's Manchester United (whose team included Baker's ex Torino teammate, Denis Law). 
In that season, Baker was injured in the 3–2 victory over Everton in the FA Cup 6th round and missed the rest of the season. Prior to his injury, Forest had lost only once in 28 games; after it they only won three of their six remaining league games and lost in the FA Cup semi-final to Tottenham Hotspur. In three years at Forest, Baker scored 41 goals in 118 league games.

Sunderland, return to Hibs and Raith Rovers
Baker then moved to Sunderland for a fee of £30,000, and spent the following two seasons playing for the Black Cats.

He returned to Hibernian for a second time in 1971 and scored 12 goals in 30 appearances. He moved to Raith Rovers in 1972 and retired in 1974, having in all scored 301 league goals in 507 games.

International career
Baker's talents meant that he was selected by the Scottish Schools team, but his birthplace made him only eligible to play for England under the rules of the time; "I was the first Scottish League player to play for England and it was a hard thing to take because I was a Scot, as far as I was concerned."

He made his England debut against Northern Ireland in 1959, which made him the first professional player to be capped for England while playing for a club outside the English football league system. It also meant that he was the first player to play for England without having ever played for an English club (Owen Hargreaves was the next player to do this, in 2001).

Baker won eight caps for the senior England side, five while he was playing for Hibs and three while with Arsenal. These later caps were won when he earned a brief recall to the England side in 1965. Despite scoring in a 2–0 win over Spain, Baker did not make the squad for the 1966 FIFA World Cup.

Managerial career and later life

Baker later became Albion Rovers manager on two occasions, but never pursued a full coaching career, instead running a pub and working for Hibernian's hospitality service. He died at the age of 63, after suffering a heart attack during a charity golf tournament, dying in Wishaw General Hospital soon after.

References

Bibliography

External links

Article on Joe Baker

1940 births
2003 deaths
Albion Rovers F.C. managers
Armadale Thistle F.C. players
Arsenal F.C. players
England international footballers
England under-23 international footballers
English expatriate footballers
English football managers
English footballers
English people of Scottish descent
Expatriate footballers in Italy
English expatriate sportspeople in Italy
Hibernian F.C. players
Nottingham Forest F.C. players
Footballers from Motherwell
Scotland youth international footballers
Raith Rovers F.C. players
Scottish Football League managers
Scottish Football League players
Scottish Junior Football Association players
Serie A players
Footballers from Liverpool
Sunderland A.F.C. players
English Football League players
Torino F.C. players
Newmains United Community F.C. players
Scottish league football top scorers
Association football forwards
Anglo-Scots